Bejaria racemosa, commonly known as tarflower, is a woody shrub with a fragrant flower found in the southeastern US states of Florida, Georgia, and Alabama. It grows on flatlands in groups. Insects become trapped on its flowers due to the sticky secretions found there.

References

Ericoideae